A humpy, also known as a gunyah, wurley, wurly or wurlie, is a small, temporary shelter, traditionally used by Australian Aboriginal people. These impermanent dwellings, made of branches and bark, are sometimes called a lean-to, since they often rely on a standing tree for support.

Etymology
The word humpy comes from the Jagera language (a Murri people from Coorparoo in Brisbane); other language groups would have different names for the structure. In South Australia, such a shelter is known as a "wurley" (also spelled "wurlie"), possibly from the Kaurna language.

Usage
Both names were adopted by early white settlers, and now form part of the Australian lexicon. The use of the term appears to have broadened in later usage to include any temporary building made from any available materials, including canvas, flattened metal drums, and sheets of corrugated iron.

Gallery

See also
 Wiltja
 Hogan
 Igloo
 Longhouse
 Tipi
 Yurt

Notes

External links
State Library of Victoria photo of Aboriginal people and humpy

Australian Aboriginal bushcraft
Australian Aboriginal cultural history
Huts in Australia
Human habitats
Indigenous architecture
Architecture in Australia
Australian Aboriginal words and phrases
House types